In mathematics, the Hill equation or Hill differential equation is the second-order linear ordinary differential equation

where  is a periodic function by minimal period . By these we mean that for all 
 

and
 

It is named after George William Hill, who introduced it in 1886.

Because  has period , the Hill equation can be rewritten using the Fourier series of :

Important special cases of Hill's equation include the Mathieu equation (in which only the terms corresponding to n = 0, 1 are included) and the Meissner equation.

Hill's equation is an important example in the understanding of periodic differential equations. The precise form of the solutions to Hill's equation is described by Floquet theory. Solutions can also be written in terms of Hill determinants.

Aside from its original application to lunar stability, the Hill equation appears in many settings including the modeling of a quadrupole mass spectrometer, as the one-dimensional Schrödinger equation of an electron in a crystal, quantum optics of two-level systems, and in accelerator physics.

References

External links
 
 

Ordinary differential equations